Seven Men, One Woman (French: Sept hommes, une femme) is a 1936 French romantic comedy film directed by Yves Mirande and starring Fernand Gravey, Véra Korène and Pierre Larquey.

The film's art direction was by René Renoux.

Cast
 Fernand Gravey as Brémontier  
 Véra Korène as Countess Lucie de Kéradec  
 Pierre Larquey as Langlois  
 Roger Duchesne as de Villiers  
 Saturnin Fabre as Derain  
 Maurice Escande as Bizulier  
 Félix Oudart as Barfleur 
 Robert Arnoux as Vauxcouleur  
 Jane Loury as La mère de Lucie 
 Pierre Feuillère as Massa  
 Simone Texier as Annette  
 Charles Lemontier as Julien  
 Doumel as Le patron de l'hôtel  
 Georges Bever as Anatolz 
 Claude Marty as Le bijoutier  
 Emile Saulieu as Pierre  
 Léonce Corne as L'huissier  
 Georges Cahuzac as L'assistant  
 Jane Lamy

References

Bibliography 
 Rège, Philippe. Encyclopedia of French Film Directors, Volume 1. Scarecrow Press, 2009.

External links 
 

1936 films
French romantic comedy-drama films
1930s romantic comedy-drama films
1930s French-language films
Films directed by Yves Mirande
French black-and-white films
1936 comedy films
1936 drama films
1930s French films